The TD Bank Mayor's Cup was a cycling criterium held in Boston, Massachusetts between 2009 and 2016. The race was held in Downtown Boston with the course circling Boston City Hall and the general Government Center area. The race's name came from the main sponsors, TD Bank and the City of Boston. The race was held on the same weekend as Hub on Wheels, an annual bike ride along the Charles River.

Due to construction in the area, the 2017 edition was canceled and the race has not been held since.

The race was notable for offering equal payouts to the men's and women's field in 2010.

Results

Men's Pro 1 Winner

Women's Pro 1/2 Winner

References 

2009 establishments in the United States
2016 disestablishments in the United States
Cycle races in the United States
Defunct cycling races in the United States
Men's road bicycle races
Recurring sporting events disestablished in 2016
Recurring sporting events established in 2009